David González Giraldo (born 20 July 1982), known as David González, is a Colombian football manager and former player who played as a goalkeeper. He is the current manager of Categoría Primera A club Independiente Medellín.

Playing career
Born in Medellín, González began his career at his hometown club Independiente Medellín. In 2002, at the age of 20, he became the youngest goalkeeping champion in the history of Colombian football. In 2006, he moved to Deportivo Cali, before going to Çaykur Rizespor, where he spent two seasons. In 2009, he spent a short time at Club Atlético Huracán in Argentina before becoming a free agent. González has played over 300 professional club games in South America and Turkey along with the SPL and the English Championship.

Manchester City
At the end of 2009 he had a trial with Manchester City, which proved to be successful and signed in January 2010. González was not named, in Manchester City's 25-man squad for the 2010–11 season but became the first choice reserve team goalkeeper where he made some outstanding performances, alerting many Championship clubs to a potential loan move.

Leeds United loan
On 31 January 2011, on transfer deadline day, González signed a short-term loan with Leeds United With injuries to Shay Given and Gunnar Nielsen, City manager Roberto Mancini had hinted he may recall González as third choice City keeper for the rest of the season. However, González remained at Leeds as cover for Kasper Schmeichel and Shane Higgs. On 9 May, González returned to City.

Aberdeen loan
On 21 June, it was announced that Manchester City were in talks with Scottish Premier League side Aberdeen in regards to a loan move for González. Aberdeen completed the signing of González on 29 June 2011 on a 6-month loan from Manchester City. González became first choice keeper for the Dons until October with regular starter Jamie Langfield sidelined after suffering a seizure in the 2010–11 season. González made his debut against St Johnstone in the opening game of the season.

Brighton & Hove Albion
On 19 January 2012, González signed a five-month temporary contract as cover with Brighton & Hove Albion after his contract with Manchester City was cancelled by mutual consent.

González made his debut in the 2–2 draw against Watford on 17 April 2012 going on to play three more games including playing the last game of the season against Barnsley where he kept a clean sheet, Gonzalez left Brighton after the expiration of his contract at the end of April 2012.

Barnsley
At the beginning of the 2012–13 season González signed a one-month deal with Barnsley as cover, due to the injuries of the No.1 and No.2 goalkeepers, playing three games in the Championship. He then moved back to Colombia to sign for Deportivo Pasto in the Colombian first division for one season.

International career
In 2004, González was called up to take part of the 2004 CONMEBOL Men Pre-Olympic Tournament disputed in Chile. He played for the senior team in a 2–1 win against South Korea on 15 January 2005.

Managerial career
On 28 June 2022, González was appointed as manager of Independiente Medellín.

Notes

References

External links
 
 
 
 
  
  
 

1982 births
Living people
Colombian footballers
Footballers from Medellín
Colombia international footballers
Association football goalkeepers
Atlético Nacional footballers
Independiente Medellín footballers
Deportivo Cali footballers
Çaykur Rizespor footballers
Club Atlético Huracán footballers
Manchester City F.C. players
Leeds United F.C. players
Aberdeen F.C. players
Brighton & Hove Albion F.C. players
Barnsley F.C. players
Deportivo Pasto footballers
Águilas Doradas Rionegro players
Categoría Primera A players
Süper Lig players
Scottish Premier League players
Colombian expatriate footballers
Expatriate footballers in Turkey
Expatriate footballers in Argentina
Expatriate footballers in England
Expatriate footballers in Scotland
Independiente Medellín managers